The 1955 Bordeaux Grand Prix was a non-championship Formula One motor race held on 24 April 1955 on a street circuit centred around the Place des Quinconces in Bordeaux, France. The Grand Prix was won by Jean Behra, who also set pole position, driving a Maserati 250F. Luigi Musso finished second and Roberto Mieres third. Less than a minute separated the three drivers after nearly three hours of racing. Stirling Moss, who had lost time fixing a loose tank strap, set fastest lap during a spirited attempt to catch the leading trio.

Classification

Race

References

Bordeaux
Bordeaux Grand Prix
Bordeaux Grand Prix